Qian'an is a county-level city in the northeast of Hebei province, China. It is under the administration of Tangshan City.

Administrative divisions

Subdistricts:
Yongshun Subdistrict, Xing'an Subdistrict, Yangzidian Subdistrict, Binhe Subdistrict

Towns:
Qian'an Town, Xiaguanying, Jianchangying, Zhaodianzi, Yajituo, Dacuizhuang, Caiyuan, Malanzhuang, Shaheyi, Muchangkou

Townships:
Kouzhuang Township, Pengdianzi Township, Shangzhuang Township, Yanjiadian Township, Wuchong'an Township, Dawuli Township, Taipingzhuang Township

Climate

References

External links

County-level cities in Hebei
Tangshan